André Döring, is a former Brazilian footballer who played as a goalkeeper. He was born in Venâncio Aires, Rio Grande do Sul, on June 25, 1972. He currently works as assistant coach in Sport Club Internacional B.

He made a single appearance for Brazil in a friendly match against Yugoslavia in 1998.

Honours
 Rio Grande do Sul State Championship: 1991, 1992, 1994, 1997, 2004, 2005.
 Minas Gerais State Championship: 2003.
 Minas-South Cup: 2001.
 Brazilian Cup: 1992, 2000, 2003.
 Brazilian Championship: 2003

References

1972 births
Sportspeople from Rio Grande do Sul
Living people
Brazilian footballers
Sport Club Internacional players
Cruzeiro Esporte Clube players
Esporte Clube Juventude players
Brazilian people of German descent
Association football goalkeepers